Panteley Dimitrov (2 November 1940 – 23 June 2001) was a Bulgarian football midfielder who played for Bulgaria in the 1962 FIFA World Cup. He also played for PFC CSKA Sofia.

Honours

Club
CSKA Sofia
 Bulgarian League (4): 1958–59, 1959–60, 1960–61, 1961–62
 Bulgarian Cup: 1960–61

References

External links
FIFA profile
Dimitrov Stats for CSKA at fccska.com

1940 births
2001 deaths
Bulgarian footballers
Bulgaria international footballers
Association football midfielders
PFC CSKA Sofia players
PFC Spartak Varna players
First Professional Football League (Bulgaria) players
1962 FIFA World Cup players